The Audacious Mr. Squire is a 1923 British silent comedy film directed by Edwin Greenwood and starring Jack Buchanan, Valia and Dorinea Shirley. The film was written by Eliot Stannard and produced by Edward Godal.

Cast
Jack Buchanan as Tom Squire
Valia as Constance
Dorinea Shirley as Bessie
Russell Thorndike as Harry Smallwood
Malcolm Tod as Edgar
Sidney Paxton as John Howard
Forbes Dawson as Pitt
Fred Rains as Jupp

References

Bibliography
 Low, Rachael. History of the British Film, 1918-1929. George Allen & Unwin, 1971.

External links

British comedy films
British silent feature films
1923 comedy films
1923 films
Films directed by Edwin Greenwood
Films shot at Walthamstow Studios
British black-and-white films
1920s British films
Silent comedy films